Board of Works may refer to 

 Metropolitan Board of Works, a former governmental department overseeing public works in London, UK
 Ministry of Works of imperial China, a former governmental department overseeing its public works
 The Board of Works, or The Board, operates under the Melbourne and Metropolitan Board of Works Act 1958 for the benefit of people in metropolitan Melbourne.
 Office of Public Works, a revised name for the government agency in Ireland originally known as Board of Works.